The  African spoonbill  (Platalea alba) is a long-legged wading bird of the ibis and spoonbill family Threskiornithidae. The species is widespread across Africa and Madagascar, including Botswana, Kenya, Mozambique, Namibia, South Africa, and Zimbabwe.

Biology
It lives in marshy wetlands with some open shallow water and nests in colonies in trees or reedbeds. They usually don't share colonies with storks or herons. The African spoonbill feeds in shallow water, and fishes for various fish, molluscs, amphibians, crustaceans, insects and larvae. The animal uses its open bill to catch foods by swinging it from side-to-side in the water, which catches foods in its mouth. Long legs and thin, pointed toes enable it to walk easily through varying depths of water.

The African spoonbill is almost unmistakable through most of its range. The breeding bird is all white except for its red legs and face and long grey spatulate bill. It has no crest, unlike the common spoonbill. Immature birds lack the red face and have a yellow bill. Unlike herons, spoonbills fly with their necks outstretched.

Breeding

The African spoonbill begins breeding in the winter, which lasts until spring. During the breeding season, adult male African Spoonbills develop more plumage and brighter coloration.The spoonbill's nest, generally located in trees above water, is built from sticks and reeds and lined with leaves. Three to five eggs are laid by the female birds, usually during the months of April or May. The eggs are incubated by both parents for up to 29 days, and upon hatching the young birds are cared for by both parents for around 20 to 30 days. The birds are ready to leave the nest soon afterward, and begin flying after another four weeks.

The African spoonbill is one of the species to which the Agreement on the Conservation of African-Eurasian Migratory Waterbirds (AEWA) applies.

References

Further reading
Grzimek, H. C. Bernhard, ed. (1972). Grzimeks Animal Life Encyclopedia of Birds. New York, New York: Van Nostrand Reinhold Company.
Middleton, Alex L. A. and Dr. Christopher M. Perrins, eds. (1985). The Encyclopedia of Birds. New York, New York: Facts on File, Inc.

External links

 African Spoonbill - Species text in The Atlas of Southern African Birds.

Platalea
Birds of Africa
Birds of Madagascar
Birds of Sub-Saharan Africa
Birds described in 1786